Brian Williams is a Trinidadian football coach and former football player.

Career
As a player, Williams featured for Trinidad and Tobago in qualifying campaigns for the 1982 FIFA World Cup and 1990 FIFA World Cup. He participated in the 1987 Pan American Games football tournament and the qualification campaign for the 1988 Summer Olympics football tournament.

Williams made his international debut against Netherlands Antilles at the age of 19 in November 1980. His final appearance was against Russia in November 1990.

He was appointed as head coach of the Trinidad and Tobago national under-20 football team in April 2016.

Reference 

1961 births
Living people
Association football defenders
Trinidad and Tobago footballers
Trinidad and Tobago international footballers
Trinidad and Tobago expatriate footballers
Recipients of the Chaconia Medal